Gartymore is an area, lying on the east coast of Sutherland and located less than 0.5 miles south west of Helmsdale, close to West Helmsdale, in the Scottish Highlands and is in the Scottish council area of Highland.

References

Populated places in Sutherland